Sateenkaarifilmi Oy is a defunct Finnish film production company. It produced several films in the early 1980s, including Aidankaatajat eli heidän jälkeensä vedenpaisumus in 1982. The company was founded in 1979 and ceased to exist in 1999. It was part of the North Finland Film Commission.

Production filmography
1980 – Lasse Viren
1980 – 
1981 – Elämän puolesta
1981 – 
1982 – Aidankaatajat eli heidän jälkeensä vedenpaisumus
1982 – 
1983 –

References

Film production companies of Finland